In Bihar the RJD leader Laloo Prasad Yadav, husband of the Bihar Chief Minister Rabri Devi, was able to assemble a broad coalition of anti-NDA parties. It included RJD, Congress, Lok Janshakti, NCP and CPI(M). Congress was sceptical of the coalition, since the party was only allotted four seats by Laloo. The other coalition partners argued that four seats actually reflected the decreasing strength of Congress in the state. Lok Janshakti, a party with strong support amongst Dalit communities, were allotted eight seats. NCP and CPI(M) were allotted one seat each. RJD itself contested 26 seats.

Two large non-NDA parties in the state, CPI and CPI(ML) Liberation, did not join the Laloo-led front but contested individually. CPI(ML)L contested 21 seats and CPI six.

The NDA front consisted of BJP and JD(U). The alliance was threatened at several points, over disagreements on seat-sharing formulas. In the end JD(U) contested 24 seats and BJP 16.

BSP contested all 40 seats and SP 32 on their own, unsuccessfully. Lok Janshakti held sway over Dalit votes and RJD over Yadav votes, thus making it impossible for the Uttar Pradesh-based caste parties to make a breakthrough in the state.

The result was an overwhelming victory for the Laloo-led coalition. It won 29 seats. The rest went to the BJP-JD(U) combine.

Voting in the state was confronted with many irregularities, and repolling was ordered in four constituencies.

Voting and results

Results by Party

Note: In 1999, before Jharkhand was created as a separate state, Bihar had 54 constituencies.

Results by constituency

External links 
Thisismyindia – Election results 2005

Bihar
Indian general elections in Bihar
2000s in Bihar